Mbala may refer to:


Culture
Mbala people, an ethnic group of the Democratic Republic of Congo
Mbala language, spoken by the Mbala

People
Mbala Mbuta Biscotte (b. 1985), Congolese footballer
David Mbala (b. 1993), Congolese footballer
Yves Mekongo Mbala (b.  1987), Cameroonian basketball player

Places
Mbala Kingdom, a kingdom in part of what is now Angola in 1600
Mbala, Cameroon
Mbala, Central African Republic
Mbala, Zambia
Mbala District, Zambia
Mbala Airport, Zambia

See also
M'Bala

Bantu-language surnames